The 1906–07 Sheffield Shield season was the 15th season of the Sheffield Shield, the domestic first-class cricket competition of Australia. New South Wales won the championship.

Table

Statistics

Most Runs
Austin Diamond 451

Most Wickets
Albert Wright 25

References

Sheffield Shield
Sheffield Shield
Sheffield Shield seasons